United Nations Security Council resolution 521, adopted unanimously on 19 September 1982, after condemning the massacre of Palestinians in Beirut, Lebanon, by the Lebanese Forces militia group, the Council reaffirmed resolutions 512 (1982) and 513 (1982) which called for respect for the rights of the civilian population without any discrimination and repudiates all acts of violence against that population.

The resolution continued by authorising the Secretary-General to increase the number of United Nations observers in and around Beirut from 10 to 50 and insists that there shall be no interference with the deployment of the observers and that they shall full freedom of movement. It also requested the Secretary-General to, as a matter of urgency, initiate appropriate consultations and in particular consultations with the Government of Lebanon on additional steps which the Council might take, including the possible deployment of United Nations forces, to assist that Government in ensuring full protection for the civilian population in and around Beirut.

Finally, Resolution 521 reminded Member States to accept and carry out resolutions by the Council under Article 25 of the Charter of the United Nations and requested the Secretary-General to report to the Council within forty-eight hours on developments in the region.

See also 
 1982 Lebanon War
 Cedar Revolution
 Israeli–Lebanese conflict
 Lebanese Civil War
 List of United Nations Security Council Resolutions 501 to 600 (1982–1987)
 Sabra and Shatila massacre
 Syrian occupation of Lebanon
 United Nations Interim Force in Lebanon

References
Text of the Resolution at undocs.org

External links
 

 0521
 0521
Israeli–Lebanese conflict
1982 in Israel
1982 in Lebanon
 0521
September 1982 events